Gu Maoxuan was a Chinese diplomat. He was Ambassador of the People's Republic of China to Albania (1989–1992).

References

Ambassadors of China to Albania
Possibly living people
Year of birth missing (living people)
Chinese diplomats